La Fuente de San Esteban is a village and large municipality in the province of Salamanca,  western Spain, part of the autonomous community of Castile-Leon.

The town formerly had a direct rail connection to Oporto in Portugal via the Douro railway line. The section between La Fuente de San Estaban and the border with Portugal was closed in 1984.

Geography
The municipality contains the smaller villages of Boadilla (197 people), Muñoz (99 inhabitants) and Santa Olalla de Yeltes.

See also
List of municipalities in Salamanca

References

Municipalities in the Province of Salamanca